Palatine arteries can refer to:

 Ascending palatine artery (arteria palatina ascendens)
 Descending palatine artery (arteria palatina descendens)
 Greater palatine artery (arteria palatina major)
 Lesser palatine arteries (arteriae palatinae minores)